The A1 Team Greece was the Greek team of A1 Grand Prix, an international racing series.

Owners 

A1 Team Greece owner was Stathis Basios. The Team was managed by Arena Motorsport.

Drivers 

The drivers for the Greek team were Takis Kaitatzis and Nikos Zahos as race drivers, Stelios Nousias and Vasilis Papafilippou as test and practice drivers.

End 

The team folded after just 4 races in the 2006-07 season after poor results. The team has not resurfaced since the fold.

Complete A1 Grand Prix results 

(key), "spr" indicate a Sprint Race, "fea" indicate a Main Race.

External links
A1gp.com Official A1 Grand Prix Web Site

Greece A1 team
National sports teams of Greece
Motorsport in Greece
Auto racing teams established in 2006
Auto racing teams disestablished in 2007
2006 establishments in Greece
2007 disestablishments in Greece